Orwellion occidentalis is a species of beetle in the family Cerambycidae. It was described by Giesbert and Hovore in 1976.

References

Elaphidiini
Beetles described in 1976